Caladenia occidentalis, commonly known as the ruby spider orchid, is a species of orchid endemic to the south-west of Western Australia. It has a single erect, hairy leaf and one or two pinkish-red flowers with a white, red-striped labellum.

Description 
The sepals and petals have long, reddish, thread-like tips. The sides of the labellum have short, blunt teeth, and the tip is curled under. There are two rows of cream to pinkish, anvil-shaped calli along the centre of the labellum. Flowering occurs from August to mid-October.

Taxonomy and naming 
Caladenia occidentalis was first described in 2001 by Stephen Hopper and Andrew Phillip Brown from a specimen collected near Mandurah and the description was published in Nuytsia. The specific epithet (occidentalis) is a Latin word meaning "western" referring to the distribution of this species.

Distribution and habitat 
The ruby spider orchid occurs between Bunbury and Arrowsmith in the Geraldton Sandplains, Jarrah Forest, Murchison and Swan Coastal Plain biogeographic regions where it grows in woodland and on the edges of seasonal swamps and lakes.

Conservation
Caladenia occidentalis is classified as "not threatened" by the Western Australian Government Department of Parks and Wildlife.

References

occidentalis
Orchids of Western Australia
Endemic orchids of Australia
Plants described in 2001
Endemic flora of Western Australia
Taxa named by Stephen Hopper
Taxa named by Andrew Phillip Brown